The , commonly called the Shinmeikai or affectionately the , is a popular Japanese dictionary published by Sanseidō. They also publish the analogous Sanseido Kokugo Jiten dictionary, a lexicographical sister that shares several of the same editors.

This Japanese language reference work has frequently undergone revisions and republications.
1943, 1st edition Meikai kokugo jiten 
1952, 2nd edition Meikai kokugo jiten 
1972, 1st edition Shin meikai kokugo jiten　
1974, 2nd edition Shin meikai kokugo jiten 
1981, 3rd edition Shin meikai kokugo jiten 
1989, 4th edition Shin meikai kokugo jiten 
1997, 5th edition Shin meikai kokugo jiten 
2005, 6th edition Shin meikai kokugo jiten
2011, 7th edition Shin meikai kokugo jiten
2020, 8th edition Shin meikai kokugo jiten

                                                                                                                                      
The chief editors of the early versions were Kindaichi Kyōsuke (1882-1971), Kindaichi Haruhiko (1913-2004), Kenbō Hidetoshi (見坊 豪紀, 1914-1992), and most notably Yamada Tadao (山田 忠雄, 1916-1996). The 6th edition, which contains some 76,500 entries, still lists Yamada as chief editor, but was edited by Shibata Takeshi (柴田武) and Sakai Kenji (酒井憲二). The Shinmeikai kokugo jiten is one of the most popular dictionaries among high-school students. According to Sanseido, all the editions have collectively sold over 19,500,000 copies.

Following the death of Yamada Tadao, the Shin meikai kokugo jiten acquired a certain notoriety in Japan after the publication of the humorous bestsellers by Akasegawa Genpei (1996, "Mysteries of the Shinkai-san") and Suzuki Makiko (1998, "How to read the Shinkai-san"). They revealed the idiosyncratic nature of many dictionary definitions written by Yamada. In addition to providing a general definition of a word, this editor sometimes added personal commentaries reflecting his experience and philosophy, making the otherwise bland definitions an enjoyable and at times philosophical reading. For example, compare these definitions of ren'ai (恋愛 "love") in a common dictionary and the Shinmeikai:
Love between a man and a woman, or the feeling one feels in such a situation. 
To feel an affection for an individual of the opposite sex so intense that one would not regret sacrificing anything for that person; the person is constantly on one’s mind, prompting the wish to always be together and share a private world; one feels happy when that desire is satisfied and anxious or depressed should the slightest doubt about that person’s affections arise. (tr. The Japan Forum 2005) 

"This is probably the best-selling and most well known of the smaller kokugo dictionaries," writes Gally (1999), "though its fame rests less on its authority than on the quirkiness of its definitions." Based upon Yamada's definitions, Gally describes him as "a misogynist cynic who enjoyed eating fish (many of the definitions of fish names identify the particular fish as tasty, an opinion that may not be shared by all)."

References

 
The Japan Forum, (2005), The Japanese Language Boom: Renewed appreciation for the beauty and pleasure of the language, Takarabako 4.

External links
 新明解国語辞典第八版, Sanseido homepage for 8th ed. Shinmeikai kokugo jiten

Japanese dictionaries
Sanseido books